Pralay ("Pralaya : Apocalypse") is a canisterised tactical, surface-to-surface, short-range ballistic missile (SRBM) for battlefield use developed by the Defence Research and Development Organisation (DRDO) of India. The missile is an amalgamation of technologies developed for exoatmospheric interceptor missile Prithvi Defence Vehicle (PDV) from Indian Ballistic Missile Defence Programme and Prahaar tactical missile.

Development 
Research Centre Imarat (RCI) is the lead integrator in this project. Similar foreign missiles of the same class include Dongfeng 12 (CSS-X-15), Precision Strike Missile, 9K720 Iskander and Hyunmoo 2 missile. Powered by solid fuel rocket motor, the missile follows quasi-ballistic trajectory and able to perform mid-air maneuvers using maneuverable reentry vehicle (MaRV) to defeat anti-ballistic missile (ABM) interceptors. 

Pralay uses the same composite propellant developed by High Energy Materials Research Laboratory (HEMRL) for Sagarika from K Missile family. The composite propellant is highly efficient and generates more energy compared to propellant used in Agni missile series.  

Pralay carries 350 kg to 700 kg high explosive preformed fragmentation warhead, Penetration-Cum-Blast (PCB) and Runway Denial Penetration Submunition (RDPS) at a range of 150 km to 500 km. Pralay is designed to target radar and communication installations, command and control centers and advance airfields using conventional warhead. The system is road mobile and meets the tactical ballistic missile requirement of the Indian Army. Pralay fills the gap of a conventionally armed ballistic missile that is not hampered by 'No First Use' nuclear policy.

Testing

First trial 
On 22 December 2021, DRDO conducted the maiden test of Pralay from Abdul Kalam Island. The missile followed quasi ballistic trajectory reaching the designated target at 400 km with high degree of accuracy, validating controls, guidance system and mission algorithms.

Second trial 
On 23 December 2021, DRDO conducted another test of Pralay from Abdul Kalam Island. The test was conducted using heavier payload to check the lethality and accuracy of the weapon. Pralay covered the maximum range of 500 km and was monitored by range sensors and instruments, including telemetry, radar and electro-optic tracking system deployed across the eastern coast and the downrange ships positioned near the impact point.

Induction 
The development phase of Pralay began in 2015 and took four years to test the required technologies. DRDO will conduct four test flights before the missile being commissioned. According to analysts, development of Pralay achieved an important milestone for India's future Rocket Force. In view of 2020–2021 China–India skirmishes, Indian Armed Forces in December 2022 moved proposal for acquisition of Pralay missile. On 25 December 2022, Ministry of Defence (MoD) cleared the order for 120 missiles.

See also

Shaurya (missile)
Pragati (missile)
Pranash (missile)
Prahaar (missile)

Comparable missiles
Dongfeng 12
Precision Strike Missile
9K720 Iskander
 Hyunmoo-2

References 

Short-range ballistic missiles
Ballistic missiles of India
Defence Research and Development Organisation

External links
Technical:
 DRDO Technology Focus : Warhead for Missiles, Torpedoes and Rockets